Penpahad mandal is one of the 23 mandals in Suryapet district of the Indian state of Telangana. It is under the administration of Suryapet revenue division with its headquarters at Penpahad. It is bounded by Suryapet mandal towards North, Chivvemla mandal towards North, Neredcherla mandal towards South, Munagala mandal towards East.

Geography
It is in the 152 m elevation(altitude) .

Demographics
Penpahad mandal is having population of 38,541 living in 9,347 Houses. Males are 19,522 and Females are 19,019 . Cheedella is the largest village and Nagulapahad is the smallest village in the mandal.

Villages
 census of India, the mandal has 17 settlements.
The settlements in the mandal are listed below:

Notes
(†) Mandal headquarter

References

Mandals in Suryapet district